Jews started settling in Mumbai (then Bombay) and other coastal towns of Maharashtra during the 18th century, due to its economic opportunities. The Jewish community of Bombay consisted of the remnants of three distinct communities: the Bene Israeli Jews of Konkan, the Baghdadi Jews of Iraq, and the Cochin Jews of Malabar. Presently, there are about 10 active synagogues in Maharashtra out of which 9 are in Mumbai and 1 is in Pune. Apart from this there are a couple of prayer hall and about 11 closed synagogues.

List of Synagogues in Maharashtra
There are a total of 10 active synagogues in Maharashtra. Six of these are located in downtown Mumbai. There are three on the outskirts of Mumbai, including one each in Thane, Alibaug and Panvel. Pune also houses one active synagogue.

Jewish Prayer Halls in Maharashtra
Apart from the synagogues Mumbai also houses two active Jewish prayer halls
Kurla Prayer Hall, Kurla, Mumbai
Etz Haeem Prayer Hall, Balu Changu Patil Marg, Mumbai

List of closed Synagogues of Maharashtra

There are about 10 closed Synagogue in Maharastra. 8 of these are located in Raigad District, one each in Mumbai and Pune.
 Ambepur Synagogue, Raigad District
 Beth El Ashtami Synagogue, Ashtami Village, Raigad District
Beth El Rewdanda Synagogue, Rewdanda Village, Raigad District
Beth Ha-Elohim Synagogue, Raigad District
Hessed El Synagogue, Poyand, Raigad District
Keneseth Israel Synagogue, Talley Ghosaley, Raigad District
Orle Israel Synagogue, Nandgoan Mura, Raigad District
Shaar Hathephilah Synagogue, Mhasla, Raigad District
Rodef Shalom Synagogue, Byculla, Mumbai
Succath Shelomo Synagogue, Pune

References

synagogues
Lists of synagogues in India
synagogues